Ab Sardan-e Sofla Jowkar (also Romanized as Āb Sardān-e Soflá Jowkār; also known as Āb Sardān-e Soflá) is a village in Margown Rural District, Margown District, Boyer-Ahmad County, Kohgiluyeh and Boyer-Ahmad Province, Iran. At the 2006 census, its population was 189, in 35 families.

References 

Populated places in Boyer-Ahmad County